Viktor Valeryevich Shamirov (born 24 May 1966) is a Russian film director, screenwriter, producer and actor.

Biography
Victor was born in Rostov-on-Don. He served in the army, after which he entered the Faculty of Mechanics and Mathematics. He worked in the theater Epos as a handyman. He put on the lights, mounted the scenery and rehearsed with the actors. In 1992 he moved to Moscow, where he graduated from the directing department and began working as a theater director and actor. Since 2006, he has been directing films.

Filmography (selected)
 Dikari (2006)
 The Practice of Beauty (2011)
 And Here's What's Happening to Me (2012)
 Game of Truth (2013)
 Directly Kakha (2020)

References

External links 
 
 Viktor Shamirov on kino-teatr.ru

Living people
Russian film directors
Russian screenwriters
1966 births
Russian Academy of Theatre Arts alumni
Russian theatre directors
Russian male film actors